Candelabridae is a small family of cnidarians within the class Hydrozoa. Myriothelidae Hincks, 1868 and Symplectaneidae Fraser, 1941 are now accepted as synonyms of this family.

Genera and Species
According to the World Register of Marine Species, the following genera and species exist in this family:
Candelabrum de Blainville, 1880 synonym Myriothela Sars, 1850
Candelabrum australe (Briggs, 1928)
Candelabrum austrogeorgiae (Jäderholm, 1904)
Candelabrum austro-georgiae Jäderholm, 1905
Candelabrum capensis (Manton, 1940)
Candelabrum cocksii (Cocks, 1854)
Candelabrum fritchmanii Hewitt & Goddard, 2001
Candelabrum giganteum (Bonnevie, 1898)
Candelabrum harrisoni (Briggs, 1928)
Candelabrum meridianum (Briggs, 1939)
Candelabrum minutum (Bonnevie, 1898)
Candelabrum mitra (Bonnevie, 1898)
Candelabrum penola (Manton, 1940)
Candelabrum phrygium (Fabricius, 1780)
Candelabrum serpentarii Segonzac & Vervoort, 1995
Candelabrum tentaculatum (Millard, 1966)
Candelabrum verrucosum (Bonnevie, 1898)
Fabulosus Stepanjants, Sheiko & Napara, 1990
Fabulosus kurilensis Stepanjants, Sheiko & Napara, 1990
Monocoryne Broch, 1910 synonym Symplectanea Fraser, 1941
Monocoryne bracteata (Fraser, 1943)
Monocoryne colonialis Brinckmann-Voss & Lindner, 2008
Monocoryne gigantea (Bonnevie, 1898)
Monocoryne minor Millard, 1966

References

External links

 
Aplanulata
Cnidarian families